Sally Forth may refer to:
 Sally Forth (Greg Howard comic strip) (from 1982)
 Sally Forth (Wally Wood comic strip) (1968–74)
 "Sally Forth", an episode of 3rd Rock from the Sun (season 4)

See salso
 Sally port